The Hammersmith & City line is a London Underground line that runs between Hammersmith in west London and  in east London. Between  and  it skirts the City of London, the capital's financial heart, hence the line's name. Its tunnels are just below the surface and are a similar size to those on British main lines. Most of the track and all stations are shared with either the District, Circle, or Metropolitan lines. Over 114 million passenger journeys are made each year on the Hammersmith & City and Circle lines.

The following year, a railway west from Paddington to Hammersmith was opened and this soon became operated and owned jointly by the Metropolitan and Great Western Railway companies. The line was then extended to the east, in stages, reaching the East London Railway in 1884. The line was electrified in 1906, and, in 1936, after the Metropolitan Railway had been absorbed by the London Passenger Transport Board, some Hammersmith & City line trains were extended over the former District Railway line to Barking. The Hammersmith & City route was shown on the Tube map as part of the Metropolitan line until 30 July 1990, when it was redesignated as a separate line.

Starting in 2015, the signalling system was upgraded as part of a programme to increase peak-hour capacity on the line. The six-car C Stock trains were replaced from 2012 to 2014 by new seven-car S Stock trains.

History

Metropolitan Railway

The first line built by the Metropolitan Railway (Met) was from Paddington to near Smithfield, near London's financial heart in the City; with gas-lit wooden carriages hauled by steam locomotives. Opened on 10 January 1863, it was the world's first underground railway. The line was built mostly under the New Road using the "cut-and-cover" method between Paddington and King's Cross and then in tunnel and cuttings beside Farringdon Road. Supported by the Met and the Great Western Railway (GWR), the Hammersmith & City Railway (H&CR) was built from the GWR's main line a mile west of Paddington station to the developing suburbs of Shepherd's Bush and Hammersmith. Built on viaduct largely across open fields, the line opened on 13 June 1864 with a GWR service from Farringdon to Hammersmith, services to Addison Road (now Kensington (Olympia)) on the West London Railway via a link at Latimer Road starting a few weeks later. From 1865, the Met ran trains to Hammersmith and the GWR trains to Addison Road. In 1867, the line became jointly owned by the two companies. In 1871, two additional tracks parallel to the GWR between Westbourne Park and Paddington were brought into use for the H&CR, and in 1878 the flat crossing at Westbourne Park was replaced by a dive-under. A year earlier some services had been extended via London & South Western Railway's Hammersmith (Grove Road) railway station and their line to Richmond.

The railway was extended east of Farringdon and a terminus opened at Aldgate on 18 November 1876. The Met wished to access the South Eastern Railway via the East London Railway (ELR) and jointly with the District Railway built lines from their Mansion House station to the Met's Aldgate station and east from Aldgate to reach the ELR at Whitechapel. In October 1884, the Met extended some Hammersmith services over the ELR to New Cross.

In 1902, the Whitechapel & Bow Railway was opened, linking the District Railway at Whitechapel to the London, Tilbury and Southend Railway (LT&SR) at an above-ground junction at Bow, to the west of Bromley-by-Bow station, and some District services were extended from Whitechapel to East Ham. When the line was electrified in 1906 services to Richmond were withdrawn and the western termini became Hammersmith and Kensington (Addison Road), and to the east services were diverted from the ELR to Whitechapel, until the ELR was electrified in 1914 and services ran from Hammersmith to New Cross (SER) and New Cross (LB&SCR). The 6-car electric multiple units were jointly owned by the Met and GWR until 1923 when the GWR sold theirs to the Met.

London Transport

On 1 July 1933, the Metropolitan Railway was amalgamated with other Underground railways, tramway companies and bus operators to form the London Passenger Transport Board. Through trains to New Cross and New Cross Gate were withdrawn in November 1939, the Hammersmith & City line trains terminating at Whitechapel while the longer 8-car Uxbridge line trains ran to Barking. However, this caused operational problems and from 1941 Barking was again served by trains from Hammersmith.

From 1937, new steel O stock trains, with doors remotely operated by the guard, replaced the wooden-bodied trains dating from 1906. It had been intended to operate the new trains with four or six cars, but after initial problems with the traction current only six-car formations were used. Services to Kensington (Olympia) via the curve at Latimer Road were suspended for the duration of World War II after bomb damage to the West London line in 1940. When the similar trains running on the Circle line were lengthened to six cars in 1959 and 1960, the stock of the two lines was integrated with maintenance at Hammersmith depot. Aluminium C Stock trains, with public address systems and originally unpainted, replaced these trains from 1970. One person operation was proposed in 1972, but due to conflict with the trade unions was not introduced until 1984.

A separate identity
The Hammersmith & City line was shown on the tube map as part of the Metropolitan line until 1990, when it became separated, and the Metropolitan line became the route from Aldgate to Baker Street and northwards through "Metro-land" to Uxbridge, Watford and Amersham. In 2003, the infrastructure of the Hammersmith & City line was partly privatised in a public–private partnership, managed by the Metronet consortium. Metronet went into administration in 2007 and the local government body Transport for London took over responsibilities. The reconstruction of Whitechapel station for the new Crossrail line required the reversing platforms to be taken out of use and since December 2009 all services have been extended to Plaistow or Barking.

Beginning in 2012, following the complete replacement of the Metropolitan line's A Stock with S8 Stock, the C Stock trains of the Circle and Hammersmith & City lines were replaced by the S7 Stock. The Hammersmith & City line received the S7 Stock first, with the first train entering service on 6 July 2012, running a shuttle service between Hammersmith and Moorgate before operating between Hammersmith and Barking on 9 December 2012. By March 2014, all services were provided by S7 Stock trains.

Route

Almost all of its track is shared with the other London Underground sub-surface lines: from Hammersmith to Liverpool Street with the Circle line; from Baker Street to Aldgate with the Metropolitan line, and from Aldgate East station to Barking with the District line. All its stations are shared with other lines.

After Westbourne Park the line passes beneath the Great Western Main Line re-surfacing at Royal Oak station and running alongside the main lines to Paddington station. The line enters a cutting just west of the station and a cut-and-cover tunnel at the end of the platforms. It meets the Circle and District lines from Bayswater at Praed Street Junction before passing through Edgware Road station in a cutting. After King's Cross St Pancras the line is partly in cutting but mostly in the Clerkenwell Tunnels, just after which it passes over the Ray Street Gridiron that carries the route over the City Widened Lines used for Thameslink services. There are bay platforms at Moorgate. Just before Aldgate the line diverges from the Circle and Metropolitan lines to Aldgate East. The line passes over the London Overground at Whitechapel station continuing on the  former Whitechapel & Bow Railway to Bow Road where it surfaces, and then to Bromley-by-Bow, where it runs alongside the London, Tilbury and Southend line from Fenchurch Street. At the next station, West Ham, there is a transfer with the Jubilee line, the Docklands Light Railway and London, Tilbury and Southend line. There is a bay platform at the next station, Plaistow, and the line terminates after two more stations at Barking.

Services
, off-peak there are six trains per hour, calling at all stations, and requiring 15 trains for the peak-hour service. Together with the Circle line, over 114 million passenger journeys are made each year. The journey from Hammersmith to Barking takes one hour during off-peak times. The central section from Paddington to Aldgate East is in Fare Zone 1; to the west to Hammersmith and east to Bromley-by-Bow is in Zones 2; East Ham is in both Zones 3 and 4, whilst Barking is in Zone 4 alone.

Rolling stock

Services are provided by S7 Stock trains, part of Bombardier's Movia family, with air-conditioning as the sub-surface tunnels (unlike those on the deep-level tube lines) are able to disperse the exhausted hot air. These trains have regenerative brakes, returning around 20 per cent of their energy to the network. Traction voltage was increased in 2017, from the present nominal 630 V to 750 V to give better performance and allow the trains to return more energy to the network through their regenerative brakes.

Depot
The line's depot is at Hammersmith, close to Hammersmith station, built by the Great Western Railway to be operated by the Metropolitan Railway when the joint railway was electrified in the early 20th century. Sidings at Barking and near High Street Kensington (Triangle Sidings) stable trains overnight. Sidings at Farringdon were used during the C stock era; due to the greater length of the new S stock trains, these are no longer in use.

Four Lines Modernisation 

It was planned that a new signalling system would be used first on the sub-surface lines from the end of 2016, but signalling contractor Bombardier was released from its contract by agreement in December 2013 amid heavy criticism of the procurement process and London Underground subsequently awarded the contract for the project to Thales in August 2015.

With the introduction of S7 Stock, the track, electrical supply, and signalling systems are being upgraded in a programme planned to increase peak-hour capacity on the line by 27 per cent by the end of 2023. A single control room for the sub-surface railway opened at Hammersmith on 6 May 2018, and Communications Based Control (CBTC) provided by Thales will progressively replace 'fixed block' signalling equipment dating back the 1940s.

The rollout of CBTC has been split into sections, each known as a Signal Migration Area (SMA), and are located on the line as follows:

List of stations

Notes and references

Notes

References

Bibliography

Further reading

External links

 
 
 

London Underground lines
Transport in the London Borough of Camden
Transport in the London Borough of Hammersmith and Fulham
Transport in the London Borough of Islington
Transport in the Royal Borough of Kensington and Chelsea
Transport in the City of Westminster
Transport in the City of London
Transport in the London Borough of Tower Hamlets
Transport in the London Borough of Newham
Transport in the London Borough of Barking and Dagenham
Railway lines opened in 1864
Standard gauge railways in London